The Draco Dwarf is a spheroidal galaxy which was discovered by Albert George Wilson of Lowell Observatory in 1954 on photographic plates of the National Geographic Society's Palomar Observatory Sky Survey (POSS).  It is part of the Local Group and a satellite galaxy of the Milky Way galaxy.  The Draco Dwarf is situated in the direction of the Draco Constellation at 34.6° above the galactic plane.

Characteristics
Paul W. Hodge analyzed the distribution of its stars in 1964 and concluded that its ellipticity was 0.29 ± 0.04. 
Recent studies have indicated that the galaxy may potentially hold large amounts of dark matter. Having an absolute magnitude of -8.6 and a total luminosity of only , it is one of the faintest companions to our Milky Way.

Draco Dwarf contains many red giant branch (RGB) stars; five carbon stars have been identified in Draco Dwarf and four likely asymptotic giant branch (AGB) stars have been detected.

The Draco Dwarf is estimated to be 80 ± 10 kpc from Earth and span a distance of 830 ± 100 × 570 ± 70 pc.

RR Lyrae
In 1961, Walter Baade and Henrietta H. Swope studied Draco Dwarf and discovered over 260 variables, of the 138 in the cluster's center, all but five were determined to be RR Lyrae variables.  From this work a RR Lyrae derived distance modulus of 19.55  is found which implies a distance of 81 kpc.

Metallicity
The Draco Dwarf contains primarily an old population of stars and insignificant amounts of interstellar matter (being basically dust free).  From 75% to 90% of its stars formed more than ~10 Gyr ago followed by a low rate of formation with a small burst of star formation around 2-3 Gyr ago. It has a single Gaussian distribution with average metallicity of [Fe/H] = −1.74 dex with a standard deviation (sigma/σ) of 0.24 dex and a small tail of metal-rich stars.  The central region of Draco Dwarf exhibits a concentration of more metal-rich stars there being more centrally concentrated red horizontal branch stars than blue horizontal branch stars.

Dark matter
Recently, dwarf spheroidal galaxies have become key objects for the study of dark matter.  The Draco Dwarf is one which has received specific attention.  Radial velocity computations of Draco have revealed a large internal velocity dispersion giving a mass to luminosity ratio of up to /, suggesting large amounts of dark matter.  It has been hypothesized that large velocity dispersions could be explained as tidal dwarfs (virtually unbound stellar streams from dwarf galaxies tidally disrupted in the Milky Way potential). However, Draco Dwarf's narrow horizontal branch width does not support this model. This only leaves the dark matter explanation and makes Draco Dwarf the most dark matter dominated object known as of 2007.  The dark matter distribution within Draco Dwarf is at least nearly isothermal.

At large radii, radial velocity dispersion exhibit strange behavior.  One possible explanation for this would be the presence of more than one stellar population.  This suggests the need for further study of Draco Dwarf population's metallicity and ages and of dwarf spheroidals in general.

Notes

Assuming an absolute magnitude of +0.5 V for RR Lyrae the apparent modulus of the Draco Dwarf is 19.58 m - M.  Using a reddening value towards Draco Dwarf of 0.03 ± 0.01 we get a true distance modulus of 19.55.
 Using the distance modulus formula of 1 we get an RR Lyrae estimated distance of 81 kpc.
Apparent Magnitude of 10.9 - distance modulus of 19.52 (80 kpc) = −8.6
distance 80 ± 10 kpc × tan( diameter_angle = 35′.5 × 24′.5 ) = 830 ± 100 × 570 ± 70 pc diameter

References

External links

 

Dwarf spheroidal galaxies
Peculiar galaxies
Local Group
Milky Way Subgroup
Draco (constellation)
10822
60095
?